The 2022 Alsco Uniforms 302 was the 30th stock car race of the 2022 NASCAR Xfinity Series, the first race of the Round of 8, and the 5th iteration of the event. The race was held on Saturday, October 15, 2022, in North Las Vegas, Nevada at Las Vegas Motor Speedway, a  permanent tri-oval shaped racetrack. The race took the scheduled 201 laps to complete. Josh Berry, driving for JR Motorsports, held off Noah Gragson and Justin Allgaier in the final few laps, and earned his fourth career NASCAR Xfinity Series win, along with his second of the season. He would also earn a spot in the championship 4. Gragson mainly dominated the race, leading 87 laps. 

This was the debut race for Truck Series driver, Hailie Deegan. Deegan would start the race in 20th, and would finish in 13th, making her the highest finishing female driver in their first Xfinity Series start.

Background 
Las Vegas Motor Speedway, located in Clark County, Nevada in Las Vegas, Nevada about 15 miles northeast of the Las Vegas Strip, is a  complex of multiple tracks for motorsports racing. The complex is owned by Speedway Motorsports, Inc., which is headquartered in Charlotte, North Carolina.

Entry list 

 (R) denotes rookie driver.
 (i) denotes driver who are ineligible for series driver points.

Practice 
The only 20-minute practice session was held on Friday, October 14, at 5:35 PM PST.

Qualifying 
Qualifying was held on Friday, October 14, at 6:05 PM PST. Since Las Vegas Motor Speedway is a tri-oval track, the qualifying system used is a single-car, one-lap system with only one round. Whoever sets the fastest time in the round wins the pole.

Race results 
Stage 1 Laps: 45

Stage 2 Laps: 45

Stage 3 Laps: 111

Standings after the race 

Drivers' Championship standings

Note: Only the first 12 positions are included for the driver standings.

References 

2022 NASCAR Xfinity Series
NASCAR races at Las Vegas Motor Speedway
Alsco Uniforms 302
Alsco Uniforms 302